The Northern Colorado Owlz are an independent baseball team of the Pioneer League, which is not affiliated with Major League Baseball (MLB) but is an MLB Partner League. They are based in Windsor, Colorado and will play their home games at the under construction TicketSmarter Stadium at Future Legends Complex upon completion of the ballpark.

In conjunction with a contraction of Minor League Baseball in 2021, the Pioneer League was converted from an MLB-affiliated Rookie Advanced league to an independent baseball league and granted status as an MLB Partner League. The league's Orem Owlz of Orem, Utah, relocated to Windsor concurrent with this change to the league.

With the addition of the Boise Hawks from the former Northwest League, the Pioneer League was left with nine teams for the 2021 season, though this problem was solved when the Owlz elected to sit out the 2021 season to allow for construction of their new ballpark to be completed. TicketSmarter Stadium at Future Legends Complex is expected to open in 2022. The Owlz will play at Jackson Field at the University of Northern Colorado until then.

References

External links
 

Pioneer League (baseball) teams
Professional baseball teams in Colorado
Baseball teams established in 2021
2021 establishments in Colorado
Weld County, Colorado